Niels Lolk Helveg Petersen (informally Niels Helveg; 17 January 1939 – 3 June 2017) was a Danish politician. He was Minister of Foreign Affairs from 1993 to 2000, having previously held the role of Minister for Economic Affairs between 1988 and 1990. He was a Member of the Folketing for the Danish Social Liberal Party from 1966 to 1974, 1977 to 1993, and again from 1994 to 2011.

Early life 
Niels Helveg Petersen was born in Odense in 1939. His parents were former cabinet minister Kristen Helveg Petersen and former Mayor of Copenhagen Lilly Helveg Petersen. He graduated from the University of Copenhagen in 1965, earning a cand.jur. degree. From 1961 to 1962, he spent a year as an exchange student at Stanford University studying Government. During his years in Copenhagen he was an active member of the youth branch of the Danish Social Liberal Party, editing their paper 'Liberté'.

Political career

Member of Parliament 1966–2011
Niels Helveg Petersen ran for election to the Danish Parliament for the first time in 1964. In 1966, he was elected a Member of Parliament for the first time in the Frederiksborg County. In 1974, he left Denmark to become a civil servant in the European Commission. He returned to Danish politics in 1977, this time being elected to parliament standing in the Funen constituency. He became leader of the Danish Social Liberal Party (Danish: Radikale Venstre) in 1978 and kept this role until 1990. During the 1980s, he supported the economic policies of the Conservative-Liberal government. At the same time, he supported the opposition on other questions such as security policies. In doing so, his party created majorities without the parties in government, a practice that became known as 'footnote politics'. In supporting different sides of parliament, he was sometimes referred to by the Danish media as a 'king maker', deciding which policies would pass and which would not. The Social Liberal's footnote politics ended in 1988 when the party entered the government coalition. In April 2008, Niels Helveg Petersen announced that he was not standing at the next election that took place in September 2011.

Minister for Economic Affairs 1988–90
He was Minister for Economic Affairs in the Cabinet of Poul Schlüter III from 3 June 1988 to 18 December 1990, when his party left the government coalition after poor election results in 1990. He consequently also stepped down as party leader.

Minister of Foreign Affairs 1993–2000
He was appointed Minister for Foreign Affairs from 25 January 1993 to 21 December 2000 in the Cabinet of Poul Nyrup Rasmussen I, II, III, and IV (except for the last part of the IV cabinet). When the European Union's Maastricht Treaty was rejected by the Danish people in 1992, it was accepted after a referendum in 1993 adding certain opt-out concessions for Denmark. As the new Minister of Foreign Affairs, Niels Helveg Petersen had to work to implement those concessions, although he had been a long supporter of greater internationalisation of Danish foreign policy. When he left the position of Foreign Minister in 2000, the official reason given was that he could no longer accept the opt-outs.
He joined the newly created Council of the Baltic Sea States, which in 1993 successfully established the EuroFaculty in Tartu, Riga, and Vilnius, of which he became an active supporter.

Personal life
Niels Helveg Petersen was married to Kirsten Lee, who is also a former member of the Danish Parliament for the Social Liberal Party. His son Morten Helveg Petersen was member of the parliament from 11 March 1998 and until August 2009. His son Rasmus Helveg Petersen was member of parliament 2011-2015 and again from 2019, and a cabinet minister 2013–2015. Niels Helveg Petersen died of esophageal cancer, aged 78.

See also
Thulegate

References

External links

 
Personal webpage from the official website of the Danish Social Liberal Party

1939 births
2017 deaths
People from Odense
Danish Social Liberal Party politicians
Foreign ministers of Denmark
Members of the Folketing
Niels
21st-century Danish politicians
Deaths from esophageal cancer
Deaths from cancer in Denmark
Leaders of the Danish Social Liberal Party